Ko Lipe is a small island in the Adang-Rawi Archipelago of the Strait of Malacca, in Satun Province of southwest Thailand, close to the Malaysian border. Its Thai name, the corrupted form of the original Malay name, Pulau Nipis ('thin island') is transliterated in many different ways into English. The most common names are "Koh Lipe", "Koh Lipeh", "Ko Lipey", and "Ko Lipe".

Ko Lipe is on the border of the Tarutao National Marine Park and is directly south of the larger islands Ko Adang and Ko Rawi, and about 50 km from the island of Ko Tarutao. It was originally settled by a group of Malayic-speaking people,sea gypsies (chao leh in Thai and 'orang laut' in Malay), known as the Urak Lawoi’ people.

The islands economy is largely centered around tourism, especially because of its white sandy beaches and scuba diving.

Access 
During high season (October to June), there are several locations from which travellers can take a ferry or speedboat to Ko Lipe, including: Ko Lanta, Pak Bara, Phi Phi, Trang, and Langkawi (Malaysia). During low season (Mid June to mid October), the only way to get to Ko Lipe is by speedboat from Pak Bara.

The ferry from Langkawi to Ko Lipe operates from mid October until mid June. From Langkawi, travellers can depart / arrive at Kuah Jetty Terminal or Telaga Harbour Terminal. From Ko Lipe, travellers can depart & arrive at Bundhaya Resort or Pattaya Beach. The journey will take about 1 hour and 30 minutes.

Tourism 
Ko Lipe has three main beaches which are Sunset Beach (Hat Pramong), Sunrise Beach (Hat Chao Ley), and Pattaya Beach. The calm, clear water makes Ko Lipe ideal for snorkeling, with 25 percent of the world's tropical fish species found in the area.

Environmental concerns 
Development on the island is rapidly growing to meet the increase in tourism, leading to issues with waste management, wildlife conservation, and energy supplies. The parks department is trying to control the amount of building on Lipe as many developers have built resorts on National Park land. Upon arrival at Ko Lipe you must pay a National Park admission fee and environmental fee.

Activity 
Popular activities for visitors to the island does include sight seeing of natural features, water sports such as scuba diving, snorkeling and kayaking, boat trips to nearby islands and reefs such as Ko Usen and Ko Kra and drinking and dining, particularly fresh seafood on walking street.

Visitors take in sunrise views on Sunrise beach and partake in nightlife on Pattaya Beach.

Scuba diving and snorkelling around Koh Lipe is often viewed as some of the best in Thailand because of the healthy reefs and range of marine life. Stonehenge dive site is among the best in Thailand.

References

External links 

Koh Lipe Island the independent Guide 
 Ko Lipe Facts
 Things To Do In Ko Lipe! The Five BEST Activities date 24/04/2018

Islands of Thailand
Lipe
Geography of Satun province